Yrjö Anton Hakala (born April 20, 1932 in Tampere, Finland) is a retired professional ice hockey player who played in the SM-liiga.  He played for Tappara and Ilves.  He was inducted into the Finnish Hockey Hall of Fame in 1985.

External links
 Finnish Hockey Hall of Fame bio

1932 births
Living people
Finnish ice hockey forwards
Ice hockey players at the 1952 Winter Olympics
Ice hockey players at the 1960 Winter Olympics
Olympic ice hockey players of Finland
Ilves players
Ice hockey people from Tampere
Tappara players